The Institute for Marine and Antarctic Studies (IMAS) is a teaching and research institute of the University of Tasmania in Hobart, Tasmania. IMAS was established in 2010, building upon the university's partnership with CSIRO Oceans and Atmosphere and the Australian Antarctic Division in cooperative Antarctic research and Southern Ocean research.

Marine geophysicist Prof. Mike Coffin was appointed founding Executive Director of IMAS in 2010. Prof. Richard Coleman, an oceanographer and cryospheric scientist, was appointed Executive Director of IMAS in July 2015. Terry Bailey has been the Executive Director since July 2019.

Research themes
The Institute aims “to improve understanding of temperate marine, Southern Ocean, and Antarctic environments, their resources, and their roles in the global climate system through research, education, and outreach”. IMAS was established with a core research and education capability, through expertise in the following foundation themes: Fisheries and aquaculture, Ecology and biodiversity, and Oceans and cryosphere. These programs are linked by three key cross-disciplinary themes to meet integrative and multidisciplinary research goals: Climate change, Ocean-Earth systems, and Oceans and Antarctic governance

The Australian Research Council's (ARC) Excellence in Research for Australia (ERA) initiatives provide a specific benchmark for the core IMAS disciplines of oceanography and fisheries sciences, and in 2012 IMAS contributed to the University of Tasmania achieving grade 5 scores in oceanography, ecology, and geology, and in fisheries sciences.

Facilities

A new 69,000m² building on the Hobart waterfront was completed in 2013, to co-locate IMAS, Australia's Integrated Marine Observing System (IMOS), the Antarctic Climate and Ecosystems Cooperative Research Centre (ACE CRC), and the Tasmanian Partnership for Advanced Computing (TPAC) staff and students. The building is adjacent to CSIRO, and aims to serve as a hub for collaborative marine and Antarctic studies. The project was an initiative of the Australian Government as part of the Education Investment Fund.

Planning is underway for existing research and educational infrastructure totaling ~4,500m², south of Hobart at Taroona, to be significantly expanded with new aquaculture and controlled-environment experimental saltwater facilities. Planned new capabilities include temperate/polar ocean simulations and enhanced aquaculture research.

Partnerships
 Australian Antarctic Division
 Antarctic Climate and Ecosystems Co-operative Research Centre (to be co-located with IMAS)
 CSIRO Marine and Atmospheric Research
 Integrated Marine Observing System (to be co-located with IMAS)
 Tasmanian Partnership in Advanced Computing (to be co-located with IMAS)
 National Centre for Marine Conservation and Resource Sustainability at the AMC (NCMCRS),
 Faculty of Science, Engineering, and Technology, University of Tasmania
 Network of Aquaculture Centres in Asia-Pacific

References

External links
Official Website

Research institutes in Australia
Schools and Faculties of the University of Tasmania
Hobart
Research institutes established in 2009
Oceanographic organizations
Antarctic research
Australia and the Antarctic
Education in Hobart
2009 establishments in Australia
Science and technology in Tasmania